Kongsberg Skiing Museum is a museum of skiing, located at  Kongsberg in Viken county, Norway. 

It was initially created by  two  Olympic champion ski jumpers, Birger Ruud and Petter Hugsted. The museum focuses on the golden age of ski jumping in Norway, from 1924 to 1952, when jumpers from Kongsberg dominated ski jumping on the national as well as international level. 

The museum collection documents skiing, ski equipment and ship production equipment from the late 1700s to around 1950. It also displays awards  issued to skiers from Kongsberg. The museum is located in central Kongsberg, together with the Norwegian Mining Museum (Norsk Bergverksmuseum).

References

External links
 Kongsberg Skiing Museum website

Ski museums and halls of fame
Museums in Viken
Sports museums in Norway
Kongsberg